Thomas Peak is the second highest named mountain in both the Ruby Mountains and Elko County, in Nevada, United States. It is the thirty-fourth highest mountain in the state. One of the most voluminous mountains in the range, its base makes up most of the east wall of Thomas Canyon, as well as the west wall of the long curved section of upper Lamoille Canyon.

Thomas Peak and the adjacent canyon and campground is named after Raymond Thomas, a teacher at Elko High School, who led a group of hikers into the canyon in October 1916. Caught in an early snowstorm, he died while assisting his party until rescuers could arrive.

Summit panorama

References

External links

Mountains of Elko County, Nevada
Ruby Mountains
Mountains of Nevada
Humboldt–Toiyabe National Forest